Ludovic Chaker (born 15 July 1979) is a former diplomat and French politician. He is chiefly known as a political advisor to French President Emmanuel Macron and the first secretary of his political movement, En Marche!.

He currently serves as a security advisor to the Chief of the Military Staff of the President of the Republic.

Biography

Early life and education 
Chaker grew up in Saint-Jean-du-Bruel, a village in Aveyron located between the Causses and the Cévennes.

In 2002, he graduated from the Institut national des langues et civilisations orientales in Mandarin Chinese and International Relations. He contributed to books focused on modern China, such as Shanghai - Histoire, promenades, anthologie et dictionnaire, directed by Nicolas Idier, in which he writes a chapter on martial arts.

He was admitted to the CELSA where he attended the intercultural management program, while studying political science at the Paris Nanterre University (2003-2004) and human resources and public affairs at Sciences Po.

Professional and political career 
Hired by the French consulate in Shanghai, he was in charge of developing cooperation between French and Chinese universities.

Upon returning to France, he became chief of staff to the mayor of Joué-lès-Tours, a city in which he was also elected.

He was then recruited by Richard Descoings as head of external relations for Asia, the Pacific region, Africa and the Middle-East of Sciences Po.

In 2012, he ran as an independent left-wing candidate for the MP seat of the Eleventh constituency for French residents overseas, that includes 49 countries in Asia and Oceania. He campaign included meeting French people via couch surfing with them in Thailand. He received 1.99% of the votes.

He then founded a consulting company, Ooda, named after the four phases (observe–orient–decide–act) of the military OODA loop.

In 2015 he joined Emmanuel Macron's team and became the first general secretary of his party, En Marche ! and its first official employee. He was then appointed as deputy general secretary and coordinator of Macron's campaign operations for the 2017 French presidential election. He was often described as a senior staffer in the candidate's team and one of its closest advisors, earning the nickname of "ninja of logistics".

After the election of Macron to the presidency, Chaker was appointed to the Military Staff of the President. Several media outlets identified him as close to Alexandre Benalla and compared him to the character of intelligence officer Malotru in the TV series The Bureau - a comparison reinforced by the fact that Chaker speaks Arabic fluently after living in Cairo.

After a reorganization of the presidential staff, he became the advisor to the Chief of the Military Staff of the President of the Republic, tasked with coordinating with the different services of the presidency and delivering notes and strategic analyses.

Martial arts and yoga 
Ludovic Chaker was taught kung-fu by master Liang Chaoqun, a proponent of the Zi Ran Men or "natural style". He then joined the leadership of the French Wan Laisheng association and authored several publications devoted to the history of martial arts. He also taught yoga.

References 

1979 births
Living people
China–France relations
21st-century French politicians
La République En Marche! politicians
Sciences Po alumni
Paris Nanterre University alumni
People from Aveyron